Khanam is a surname. Notable people with the surname include:

Ashrafi Khanam, Bangladeshi singer
Husna Banu Khanam (1922–2006), Bangladeshi writer and singer
K. J. Hamida Khanam ( 1940–2015), Bangladeshi politician
Kabita Khanam (born 1957), Bangladeshi jurist and Election Commissioner
Karimunnesa Khanam Chaudhurani (1855–1926), Bengali poet and social worker
Mahfuza Khanam, Bangladeshi academic and social activist
Meherbanu Khanam (1885–1925), Bengali noblewoman and artist
Sanjida Khanam, Bangladeshi politician
Sayeeda Khanam (1937–2020), Bangladeshi photographer
Shakeela Khanam Rashid, Pakistani politician
Shamima Akter Khanam, Bangladeshi politician
Zakia Parvin Khanam, Bangladeshi politician

See also

Char Khanam, a Bangladeshi village
Khanom (disambiguation)